Gilbert Henry Brookes (2 April 1895 – 1952) was an English footballer who played in the Football League for Luton Town, Merthyr Town, Swansea Town and Stoke.

Career
Brookes was born in Kidderminster and played for his local club Kidderminster Harriers and then Shrewsbury Town before joining First Division Stoke in 1922. He played 12 top tier matches for Stoke in 1922–23 but with Stoke heading for relegation he lost his place in the side to Leslie Scott. He left Stoke at the end of the season and went on to play for Third Division South sides Swansea Town, Luton Town and Merthyr Town before making a return to Kidderminster Harriers.

Career statistics
Source:

References

1895 births
1952 deaths
Sportspeople from Kidderminster
English footballers
Association football goalkeepers
Kidderminster Harriers F.C. players
Shrewsbury Town F.C. players
Stoke City F.C. players
Swansea City A.F.C. players
Luton Town F.C. players
Merthyr Town F.C. players
English Football League players